A subdermal implant is a body modification placed under the skin, allowing the body to heal over the implant and creating a raised design. Such implants fall under the broad category of body modification. Many subdermal implants are made out of silicone, either carved or mold injected. Many people who have subdermal implants use them in conjunction with other types of body modification to create a desired, dramatic effect. This process is also known as a 3-D implant, or pocketing.

History 
The first subdermal implant was implanted in 1994. It is generally agreed upon that they were pioneered by Steve Haworth. In his shop, HTC Body Piercing, in Phoenix, Arizona, he first began these procedures after being asked for a bracelet. He concluded that he could put a row of beads under the woman's wrist to create the effect she desired. This was followed in 1998 by the scientist Kevin Warwick who experimented with both an RFID and an electrode array implant. Since then, many different artists have done many kinds of implants. Some of the well-known names in the industry include Samppa Von Cyborg, Max Yampolskiy, Brian Decker, Emilio Gonzales and Stelarc, who had a cell-cultivated ear implanted on his arm.

Types 
According to the Church of Body Modification, there are two main types of subdermal implants: subdermal (or subcutaneous) implants and transdermal implants. Magnetic subdermal implants also exist.

Subdermal 
"Subdermal implants," as defined by the Church of Body Modification, are completely buried in the dermis. These are used for both cosmetic and medical purposes, such as the contraceptive Norplant, consisting of six levonorgestrel-releasing Silastic capsules, and is placed under the skin of the upper arm, generally a woman’s arm. The cosmetic variant can be molded into any shape desired; though usually made of silicone. However, Teflon variants exist as well.

Transdermal 

Transdermal implants are placed partially under the skin, with the rest exposed. This is done through a process known as "dermal punching". First the implant is placed in between the layers of skin. It is necessary for the part of the implant that will be located under the skin to have a proper shape. This must be one with holes in it (like a figure eight) so that the body will be able to grow around it. Once the implant is placed, the part that will protrude out is exposed using a dermal punch.

Procedure 
To have one of these implants installed, an incision is made down to the subcutaneous layer (subcutis) of the skin. A dermal elevator, a widely used medical instrument, separates the subcutis and the fascia, creating the pocket in which the implant will be inserted. After the implant is placed, the incision is stitched shut. Surgical tape is often applied to minimize movement while the skin fuses around the implant.

Contraceptive implants in the UK and Australia are "injected" under the skin using a special device similar to a large syringe or ear-piercing gun, and extracted by making a tiny incision through which the implant is pulled out. A local anesthetic is usually available for the extraction but is not required, as the cut is very small.

Applications

Electronic implants 
For electronic implants see microchip implant.

Cosmetic implants 
Cosmetic Implants range from small subdermal silicone implants to form desired shapes and forms, ranging to LED light implants that emit light from under the skin.

Genital implants 
Subdermal implants placed under the skin of the penis can provide physical stimulation for both sexual partners. The most frequent form is genital beading, using small, round implants. Short, curved rods are also used, and are called "genital ribs".

Braille tattoo 
Klara Jirkova, a student at the Berlin University of the Arts, raised the possibility of using subdermal implants to create "Braille tattoos" readable by the blind. She proposes that small implants could be grouped to form braille characters, which she says "can be read by touch – stroke by blind people. She suggests that, if located near the thumb where they could be read during a handshake, "Braille tattoos" could help the blind recognize whom they are greeting. She states that this will be a more meaningful form of body modification as it relates to the sense of touch instead of sight.

Despite the media attention Jirkova's proposal received, this application of subdermal implants is, at best, impractical. A "braille tattoo" as a form of identification between the blind would be extraneous, as the blind can easily identify others by speaking to them. Such a procedure would have a low success rate, as the implants would most likely shift during healing. The smooth, round implants Jirkova suggests are especially prone to shifting and it is likely that a "Braille tattoo" would migrate to the point of being unreadable. The commonly seen "Braille tattoo" image is a photo manipulation from Jirkova's report, not a successfully completed modification.

Although individual ball implants would present too many problems due to migration, flat premade square silicone "character" sheets with pre-positioned dots would solve the readability problems. These individual square sheets could be preformed and implanted with the desired effect.

Aftercare 
Subdermal implants are treated like many other body modifications in their aftercare. According to the Church of Body Modification, "The most important part of aftercare is keeping your sutures clean and dry." They also suggest using paper products rather than cloth to clean and cover the area, as cloth products can hold many bacteria, and that the sutures be cleaned with solutions designed for sterilizing piercings. After 10–12 days, the stitches can be removed. It can take up to 3 months for the desired effect to be reached. As part of the Church's philosophy, they encourage all to "Use common sense; know your body and listen to what it needs! Take care of yourself and your modifications." This can include seeing a doctor at the first sign of infection or for help removing sutures.

Health risks 
Subdermal implants, being similar to plastic surgery, have more risks than other kinds of body modification. Any time that the human body is opened, it must be performed in a sterile environment, in order to prevent infection. This has become a major source of controversy regarding subdermal implants.

Many health professionals are concerned for the individuals undergoing these procedures: the majority of these procedures are being performed by individuals with little to no formal medical training, and often do not take place in sterile environments.

The body modification industry is trying to make changes to the risky behaviors that are sometimes taken by unqualified people who are performing such implants. For example, David A. Vidra founded Health Educators, a company set up as "education for the modification industry". It is set up to offer qualified instructors that teach sterilization and other techniques for safe procedures.

Many medical doctors are still concerned, however. Dr. Phil Haeck states, "This is a deviation in surgery that has no place for someone that has taken the Hippocratic Oath and wants to serve mankind."

See also 
 Body modification
 Body piercing materials
 Kevin Warwick
 The Lizardman
 The Enigma
 Body hacking
 Microchip implant (human)
 Cybernetics

Notes

References

External links

 The Church of Body Modification
 Body Modification Conference

Body modification
Implants (medicine)